Roberto Felice Ardigò (28 January 1828 – 15 September 1920) was an Italian philosopher. He was an influential leader of Italian positivism and a former Roman Catholic priest.

Ardigò was born in Casteldidone, in what is now the province of Cremona, in Lombardy, and trained for the priesthood. He resigned from the Church in 1871 after abandoning theology and faith in 1869. He was appointed as a professor of theology at the University of Padua in 1881, at a time when a reaction to idealism had taken place in philosophical circles.

Inspired by Auguste Comte, Ardigò differed from Comte in that he considered thought more important than matter and insisted on psychological disquisition. He believed thought was dominant in every action and the result of every action, and that it disappears only in a state of general corruption.

He died by suicide at Mantua in 1920, at the age of 92.

Works

Psychology as a Positive Science (1870)
The Moral of the Positivists (1879).

External links 

 Roberto Ardigo on Worldcat

19th-century Italian philosophers
1828 births
1920 suicides
Clergy from the Province of Cremona
Italian republicans
19th-century Italian Roman Catholic priests
Academic staff of the University of Padua
Writers from the Province of Cremona
1920 deaths